World Sinfonía III – The Grande Passion is an album by jazz guitarist Al Di Meola that was released in 2000.

Track listing 
All songs by Al Di Meola unless otherwise noted.
"Misterio" – 7:53
"Double Concerto" (Ástor Piazzolla) – 5:55
"Prelude: Adagio for Theresa" (Di Meola, Parmisano) – 1:22
"The Grande Passion" – 9:04
"Asia de Cuba" – 8:57
"Soledad" (Piazzolla) – 7:37
"Opus in Green" – 10:18
"Libertango" (Piazzolla) – 5:06
"Azucar" – 3:12

Personnel 
 Al Di Meola – guitars, dumbek, percussion
 Michael Philip Mossman – trumpet
 Oscar Feldman – tenor saxophone
 Mario Parmisano – piano, synthesizer
 Hernan Romero – guitar, charango, vocals
 John Patitucci – acoustic bass guitar
 Gilad Dobrecky – drums
 Gumbi Ortiz – congas
 Arto Tunçboyacıyan – vocals, percussion
 Toronto Orchestra – strings, woodwinds
Fabrizio Festa – conductor

Charts

References

2000 albums
Al Di Meola albums
Telarc Records albums